The Melanotaenium is a genus of smut fungi in the family Melanopsichiaceae.

Species
Melanotaenium adoxae
Melanotaenium albizziae
Melanotaenium antirrhini
Melanotaenium apludae
Melanotaenium arthraxonis
Melanotaenium arundinellae
Melanotaenium brachiariae var. brachiariae
Melanotaenium brachiariae var. minutum
Melanotaenium brachiariae var. montanae
Melanotaenium brachiariae var. paspalidii
Melanotaenium byzovae
Melanotaenium cingens
Melanotaenium dimeriae
Melanotaenium echinochloae
Melanotaenium endogenum
Melanotaenium endogenum var. endogenum
Melanotaenium endogenum var. spermacoces
Melanotaenium eragrostidis
Melanotaenium erodianum
Melanotaenium euphorbiae
Melanotaenium gunnerae
Melanotaenium hypogaeum
Melanotaenium jaapii
Melanotaenium koschurnikovaeanum
Melanotaenium lamii
Melanotaenium metzii
Melanotaenium plumbeum
Melanotaenium plumbeum f. plumbeum
Melanotaenium spermacoces
Melanotaenium tochinaianum
Melanotaenium tuberculatae
Melanotaenium urochloae

References

Ustilaginomycotina